The , generally known as , was a Japanese popular music contest which ran from 1969 to 1986. It was sponsored by the Yamaha Music Foundation and was held annually (later, twice a year) at the Yamaha Resort Tsumagoi in Kakegawa, Shizuoka, Japan.

The grand prix winners were to be qualified for the World Popular Song Festival.

History 
 1972: The contest was renamed .
 1973: From this year, the event was held twice a year. 
May 1984: Due to a gas explosion in Tsumagoi the previous year, the Nakano Sun Plaza temporarily hosted the event. 
September 1986: The 32nd competition was held as the final Popcon event.
 1987:  replaced the Popcon.

Notable participants
The following professional singers have won in some division of awards.

Junko Yagami (1974)
Miyuki Nakajima (1975)
Motoharu Sano (1978)
Tsuyoshi Nagabuchi (1978)
Frecuencia Mod (1978) 
Chage and Aska (1979)
Crystal King (1979)
Aming (1982)
Tom Cat (1983)
Akino Arai (1984)

Winners

1st Composition Concours (1969) 
At the Nemu no Sato Yamaha Music Hall, on November 23, 1969.

Grand Prix
Jun Mayuzumi

2nd Composition Concours (1970) 
At the Nemu no Sato Indoor Hall, on November 5, 1970

Grand Prix
Mieko Hirota

3rd Composition Concours (1971) 
At the Nemu no Sato Outdoor Hall, on October 9, 1971

Grand Prix
Hide and Rosanna

4th Popcon (1972) 
At the Nemu no Sato Outdoor Hall, on October 8, 1972

Grand Prix
Chewing Gum, folk duo
Awards
Yōsui Inoue
Yumiko Kokonoe

5th Popcon (1973) 
At the Nemu no Sato Outdoor Hall, on May 20, 1973

6th Popcon (1973) 
At the Nemu no Sato Outdoor Hall, on October 13, 1973

Awards
Akiko Kosaka

Popcon Grand Prix '73 (1973) 
At the Nemu no Sato Outdoor Hall, on October 14, 1973

Grand Prix
Kouichi Ise and Manji
Akiko Kosaka

7th Popcon (1974) 
At the Tsumagoi Exhibition Hall, on May 5, 1974

Grand Prix
Kyoko Kosaka
Top Prizes
Akira Yamazaki
Yuki Katsuragi

8th Popcon (1974) 
At the Tsumagoi Exhibition Hall, on October 13, 1974

Chewing Gum

9th Popcon (1975) 
At the Tsumagoi Exhibition Hall, on May 18, 1975

Grand Prix
Shichifukujin
Best Song Award
Shigeru Matsuzaki
Awards
Miyuki Nakajima

10th Popcon (1975) 
At the Tsumagoi Exhibition Hall, on October 12, 1975

Grand Prix
Miyuki Nakajima
Best Song Award
Akira Inaba (composer)

11th Popcon (1976) 
At the Tsumagoi Exhibition Hall, on May 16, 1976

Grand Prix
Sandii
Best Son Award
Yukio Sasaki

12th Popcon (1976) 
At the Tsumagoi Exhibition Hall, on October 3, 1976

Grand Prix
White House II

13th Popcon (1977) 
At the Tsumagoi Exhibition Hall, on May 8, 1977

14th Popcon (1977) 
At the Tsumagoi Exhibition Hall, on October 2, 1977

Grand Prix
Masanori Sera & Twist

15th Popcon (1978) 
At the Tsumagoi Exhibition Hall, on May 7, 1978

Grand Prix
U・U
Best Song Award
Motoharu Sano
Award
Tsuyoshi Nagabuchi and Salty dog

16th Popcon (1978) 
At the Tsumagoi Exhibition Hall, on October 1, 1978

Grand Prix
Hiroshi Madoka
Best Song Award
Yūko Ōtomo
Highest Award
Monroes
Awards
Chage and Aska
Crystal King
S.E.N.S.

17th Popcon (1979) 
At the Tsumagoi Exhibition Hall, on May 6, 1979

Best Song Award
Ippei Suzuki
Awards
Chage and Aska
C. W. Nicol and his friends
Chizuru Matsunaga (Try-Tone)

18th Popcon (1979) 
At the Tsumagoi Exhibition Hall, on October 7, 1979

Grand Prix
Crystal King
Best Song Awards
Hironori Kaneko
Gypsy and Arere no Re (the current Stardust Revue)

19th Popcon (1980) 
At the Tsumagoi Exhibition Hall, on May 11, 1980

Grand Prix
Tomoya Itami & Side by Side (Tomoya Itami and Tomoji Sogawa)
Awards
Haruhi Aiso
Kiyotaka Sugiyama & Omega Tribe (as "Kyutipanchosu")

20th Popcon (1980) 
At the Tsumagoi Exhibition Hall, on October 5, 1980

21st Popcon (1981) 
At the Tsumagoi Exhibition Hall, on May 10, 1981

Grand Prix
Toshihiro Itoh

22nd Popcon (1981) 
At the Tsumagoi Exhibition Hall, on October 4, 1981

Grand Prix
Aladdin
Award
Yuiko Tsubokura
Kawakami Prize
Megumi Shiina

23rd Popcon (1982) 
At the Tsumagoi Exhibition Hall, on May 16, 1982

Grand Prix
Aming
Best Song Award
Asqua
Kawakami Award
Carlos Torres & the Sweet Dreams

24th Popcon (1982) 
At the Tsumagoi Exhibition Hall, on October 3, 1982

25th Popcon (1983) 
At the Tsumagoi Exhibition Hall, on May 15, 1983

26th Popcon (1983) 
At the Tsumagoi Exhibition Hall, on October 2, 1983

Grand Prix
Midori Karashima

27th Popcon (1984) 
At the Nakano Sun Plaza, on May 13, 1984

28th Popcon (1984) 
At the Tsumagoi Exhibition Hall, on October 7, 1984

Grand Prix
Tom Cat
Best Song Award
Sway
Award
Akino Arai

29th Popcon (1985) 
At the Tsumagoi Exhibition Hall, on May 12, 1985

30th Popcon (1985) 
At the Tsumagoi Exhibition Hall, on October 6, 1985

Grand Prix
Kazuyuki Ozaki & Coastal City
Best Song Award
Rika

31st Popcon (1986) 
At the Tsumagoi Exhibition Hall, on May 11, 1986

Award
Jinnouchi Taizō

32nd Popcon (1986) 
At the Tsumagoi Exhibition Hall, on September 29, 1986

See also 
 Yamaha Music Festival

References

External links 
 Popcon history 

Song contests
Music festivals in Japan
Music festivals established in 1969
Recurring events disestablished in 1986